|}

The 1000 Guineas Stakes is a Group 1 flat horse race in Great Britain open to three-year-old fillies. It is run on the Rowley Mile at Newmarket over a distance of 1 mile (1,609 metres), and it is scheduled to take place each year in late April or early May on the Sunday following the 2000 Guineas Stakes.

It is the second of Britain's five Classic races, and the first of two restricted to fillies. It can also serve as the opening leg of the Fillies' Triple Crown, followed by the Oaks and the St Leger, but the feat of winning all three is rarely attempted.

History
The 1000 Guineas was first run on 28 April 1814, five years after the inaugural running of the equivalent race for both colts and fillies, the 2000 Guineas. The two races were established by the Jockey Club under the direction of Sir Charles Bunbury, who had earlier co-founded the Derby. They were named according to their original prize funds (a guinea amounted to 21 shillings, or £1.05).

By the mid-1860s, the 1000 Guineas had become one of Britain's most prestigious races for three-year-olds. The five leading events for this age group, characterised by increasing distances as the season progressed, were now referred to as "Classics". The concept was later adopted in many other countries.

European variations of the 1000 Guineas include the German 1,000 Guineas, the Irish 1,000 Guineas, the Poule d'Essai des Pouliches and the Premio Regina Elena. Other countries to have adopted the format include Australia, Japan and New Zealand.

The 1000 Guineas is served by trial races such as the Nell Gwyn Stakes and the Fred Darling Stakes, but for some horses it is the first race of the season. The 1000 Guineas itself can act as a trial for the Oaks, and the last horse to win both was Love in 2020.

Records
Leading jockey (7 wins):
 George Fordham –  (1859), Nemesis (1861), Siberia (1865), Formosa (1868), Scottish Queen (1869), Thebais (1881), Hauteur (1883)

Leading trainer (9 wins):
 Robert Robson – Corinne (1818), Catgut (1819), Rowena (1820), Zeal (1821), Whizgig (1822), Zinc (1823), Tontine (1825), Problem (1826), Arab (1827)

Leading owner (8 wins):
 4th Duke of Grafton – Catgut (1819), Rowena (1820), Zeal (1821), Whizgig (1822), Zinc (1823), Tontine (1825), Problem (1826), Arab (1827)
 Fastest winning time – Ghanaati (2009), 1m 34.22s
 Widest winning margin –  (1859), 20 lengths
 Longest odds winner – Billesdon Brook (2018), 66/1
 Shortest odds winner – Crucifix (1840), 1/10
 Most runners – 29, in 1926
 Fewest runners – 1 (a walkover), in 1825

Winners

See also
 Horse racing in Great Britain
 List of British flat horse races

References
 Paris-Turf:
 Racing Post:

 galopp-sieger.de – 1000 Guineas Stakes.
 horseracinghistory.co.uk  – 1000 Guineas.
 ifhaonline.org – International Federation of Horseracing Authorities – One Thousand Guineas (2019).
 pedigreequery.com – 1000 Guineas Stakes – Newmarket.
 tbheritage.com (Archived 2015-04-27) – One Thousand Guineas Stakes.
 
 
 YouTube Race https://www.youtube.com/playlist?list=PLfn5x2SD03q6Sh4KLTlbK42kPrQVH3ws0

 
Flat races in Great Britain
Newmarket Racecourse
Flat horse races for three-year-old fillies
Recurring sporting events established in 1814
British Champions Series
1814 establishments in England